Kiril Andonov   (Bulgarian: Кирил Андонов) (born 1 November 1967) is a retired Bulgarian football player.

Andonov played for Vanspor during the Turkish Super Lig 1996–97 season. He also played for PFC Botev Plovdiv.

Andonov played for Bulgaria at the 1987 FIFA World Youth Championship in Chile.
Currently Andonov coach of FC Maritsa Plovdiv.

References

External links
Player Profile at lportala.net

1967 births
Living people
Bulgarian footballers
Bulgaria youth international footballers
FC Maritsa Plovdiv players
PFC Lokomotiv Plovdiv players
PFC Beroe Stara Zagora players
FC Spartak Plovdiv players
Vanspor footballers
Botev Plovdiv players
First Professional Football League (Bulgaria) players
Süper Lig players
Bulgarian expatriate footballers
Expatriate footballers in Turkey

Association football defenders